The 1970 Labour Party deputy leadership election took place on 8 July 1970, after sitting deputy leader George Brown lost his seat at the 1970 general election.

Candidates
 Michael Foot, Member of Parliament for Ebbw Vale
 Roy Jenkins, Shadow Chancellor of the Exchequer, Member of Parliament for Birmingham Stechford
 Fred Peart, Shadow Leader of the House of Commons, Member of Parliament for Workington

Results

Sources
http://privatewww.essex.ac.uk/~tquinn/labour_party_deputy.htm 

1970
Labour Party deputy leadership election
Labour Party deputy leadership election
Labour Party deputy leadership election